The Benedore River is a perennial river with no defined major catchment, located in the East Gippsland region of the Australian state of Victoria.

Course and features
The Benedore River rises in the Benedore River Reference Area and flows generally south southeast, through the Seal Creek Reference Area, before reaching its mouth with Bass Strait within the Croajingolong National Park in the Shire of East Gippsland. The river descends  over its  course.

See also

References

External links
 

East Gippsland catchment
Rivers of Gippsland (region)
Croajingolong National Park